Darrell Franklin Huntley (August 28, 1917 – August 1, 1995), was an American actor.

Filmography

Film
Actor

References 

1917 births
1995 deaths
American male film actors
People from Burley, Idaho
Male actors from Idaho
20th-century American male actors